Luke Winthrop Cole (July 15, 1962 - June 6, 2009) was an environmental lawyer and the co-founder of the Center on Race, Poverty & the Environment, in California. He was a pioneer in using legal work for the environmental justice movement.

Education and career 

Luke Winthrop Cole was born on July 15, 1962 in North Adams, Massachusetts to Herbert Cole and Alexandra Chappell Cole.

Cole graduated with honors from Stanford University in 1984, and cum laude from Harvard Law School in 1989.

Cole served as counsel for the Native Village of Kivalina, Alaska, in its case seeking damages from greenhouse gas emitters from the damage to their town due to global warming.

He taught courses in environmental justice at UC Berkeley, UC Hastings and Stanford Law.

Death 

Cole died on June 6, 2009 in a car crash in Uganda.

Publications 

 Cole, Luke, and Sheila Foster. 2001. From the Ground Up: Environmental Racism and the Rise of the Environmental Justice Movement. New York: NYU Press. .

Awards 

 Environmental Leadership Award (1997) – UC Berkeley's Ecology Law Quarterly.
 Award for Excellence in Environmental, Energy, and Resources Stewardship (2009) – American Bar Association

References

1962 births
2009 deaths
Harvard Law School alumni
Road incident deaths in Uganda
Stanford Law School faculty
Stanford University alumni
University of California, Berkeley faculty
University of California, Hastings faculty